Web of Life is a Canadian nature television series which aired on CBC Television from 1959 to 1963.

Premise
This nature series was hosted by University of British Columbia zoology professor Ian McTaggart-Cowan and produced at CBC Vancouver. Episodes used film recorded in the Arctic, the Caribbean, the Gulf of Mexico, Uganda, the American south and in the series home province (British Columbia).

Episodes of Web of Life were purchased by Granada Television for British television audiences.

Scheduling
This half-hour series was broadcast in four runs from 1959 to 1963, except 1962, as follows (times in North American Eastern zone):

References

External links
 

CBC Television original programming
1959 Canadian television series debuts
1963 Canadian television series endings
Black-and-white Canadian television shows
Nature educational television series
Television shows filmed in Vancouver